Georges Régnier (17 April 1913 - 17 January 1992) was a French film director, screenwriter and cinematographer.

Filmography 
 Cinema
 1947 : Combat pour tous (short film)
 1947 : Monsieur Badin (short film)
 1948 :  (short film)
 1949 : 
 1962 : Châteaux et rivières (documentary film)
 Télévision
 1967 : Les Sept de l'escalier quinze B
 1970 : Nanou
 1976 : Celui qui ne te ressemble pas
 1983 : Pauvre Eros
 Assistant director
 1947 : Panic (Panique) by Julien Duvivier
 1951 : Sous le ciel de Paris by Julien Duvivier

External links 

20th-century French screenwriters
French cinematographers
Film directors from Paris
1913 births
1992 deaths